Mom Rajawongse Kukrit Pramoj (20 April 1911 – 9 October 1995) was a Thai politician, scholar and professor. He was Speaker of the House of Representatives of Thailand 1973–1974. He was the thirteenth Prime Minister of Thailand, serving in office from 1975 to 1976 between Seni Pramoj, his brother's, terms. Being the great-grandson of King Rama II, he was a member of the Thai royal family.
He also portrayed the Prime Minister of the fictional country of "Sarkhan" in the 1963 motion picture The Ugly American with Marlon Brando.

Biography
He was born on 20 April 1911 at Sing Buri Province into an cadet branch of Chakri Dynasty with Chinese ancestry.  The son of Brigadier General Prince Khamrob and his wife Daeng (Bunnag), his older brother was M.R. Seni Pramoj while his great-grandmother, Ampha, was of Chinese descent and was a consort of Rama II. He served as a corporal during the Franco-Thai War in 1940. Like many upper class Thais of his generation, his parents sent him and his siblings to boarding schools in England including Trent College. He finished his bachelor's degree in Philosophy, Politics, and Economics (PPE) from Queen's College, University of Oxford.

Upon returning to Thailand, his first job was in the field of banking; but his true vocation was his mastery of many forms of arts, including politics and journalism. Put off by Hollywood's portrayal of revered nineteenth-century king, Mongkut, in the 1946 film Anna and the King of Siam, based on the semi-fictional biographical novel of the same name, Kukrit and his brother, Seni Pramoj, wrote The King of Siam speaks in 1948. They sent their manuscript to the American politician and diplomat Abbot Low Moffat who drew on it for his biography entitled Mongkut the King of Siam, and in 1961, donated the Pramoj manuscript to the Southeast Asian Collection, Asian Division, Library of Congress. He wrote for Siam Rath, the newspaper that he founded.

As a means of showing how Thai society adjusted to life in modern society, in 1953 Kukrit began a series of stories on the life and times of fictional Mae Ploy. who as a young girl enters the service of a princess of Rama V's Royal Household, and dies the same day as Rama VIII. This story was to be one of many that were published in the Kukrit's Siam Rath. His satirical sense and unique sense of humour offered an incisive view of the times Kukrit chronicled.  As a scholar, he also wrote many non-fiction works ranging from history and religion to astrology. Most notable are his epics and many short stories portraying various aspects of life and documenting contemporary history. His Many Lives (Lai Chiwit) was also translated into English. He was a leading authority on traditional Thai culture and had a polymathic range of interests from Thailand's classical dance to literature. Most famous for his literary works, he was named a National Artist of Thailand for literature in 1985, the inaugural year for the honour. And he received The Special Commemorative Prize of The Fukuoka Asian Culture Prizes in 1990, the inaugural year for the prizes again. His works encompass many subjects from humour to drama. He was also known as a staunch royalist and served the monarchy for his entire life. He is considered one of the great statesmen of Thailand.  His former home is now a heritage museum which is preserved; paying homage to his life and Thai traditions.

He was married to M.R. Pakpring Thongyai with whom he had two children,  a son and daughter. He died on 9 October 1995.

Achievements 

 He established the conservative Social Action Party
 M.R. Kukrit founded the Progress Party in 1946 and was elected to the first post-World War II Parliament
 Appeared on screen with Marlon Brando in the movie The Ugly American (1963), in which he played Prime Minister Kwen Sai and spoke both Thai and English.
 As Prime Minister, established diplomatic ties with China in 1975, and supervised the withdrawal of American forces from Thailand after the Vietnam War.
 Named National Artist in Literature 1985.
 Received the Fukuoka Asian Culture Prize in 1990.
 Founded the Khon Thammasat Troupe at Thammasat University, Khon being the highest form of dance drama in Thai classical dramatic arts.

Acting career 
When George Englund decided to use Thailand as the location for the fictional country portrayed in his film The Ugly American, Kukrit was appointed as cultural advisor to make sure the film accurately portrayed monarchy in a Buddhist country.  Englund had difficulty casting the part of the fictional Prime Minister, but he was so impressed by Kukrit's cultural refinement and mastery of English that he offered him the part, saying, "I can't think of anyone who could play it better."  Kukrit accepted, saying, according to Englund, "We are all actors anyway, and I think you're right that I could play it better than anyone." Probably because of this, after he became a real-life Prime Minister of Thailand in 1975, the word "Sarkhan" has entered the Thai language as a nickname of Thailand itself, often with a slight self-deprecating or mocking tone.

M.R. Kukrit Heritage Home 
 
The home that M.R. Kukrit built for himself in Bangkok has been registered by the Department of Fine Arts as 'Home of an Important Person'. It is open to the public on Saturdays, Sundays and official Thai holidays. Five small traditional Thai houses were dismantled and reassembled at the present site to make one house. The house is filled with artefacts and books collected by the owner. Additions to the original house include air conditioning, a modern bathroom, and a lift was installed when the owner became too frail to climb up and down stairs. The M.R. Kukrit Heritage Home is situated at 19 Soi Phra Pinit, South Sathorn Road, Sathon District, Bangkok 10120.

Literary Works

Literary career
Kukrit Pramoj is perhaps best known in Thailand for his literary production, particularly his novel Four Reigns, which was published as a serial in his newspaper Siam Rat in 1950. Four Reigns tells the story of "Mae Ploi," a young girl who grew up in the court of King Chulalongkorn (Rama V) where she was an attendant to one of the princesses.  Kukrit extends her story after her marriage during the reign of Rama VI, and in the process tells the story of mid-twentieth century Thailand through Mae Ploi's eyes.  The story includes the reigns of four Kings of the Chakri dynasty (thus the title "Four Reigns"), and the 1932 Revolution against the absolute monarchy.  Four Reigns was translated into English by Tulachandra. The Thai version of Four Reigns continues to be well known to Thais in the twenty-first century because it has been used in Thai schools, and has been produced as a well-known films.

Only two other of Kukrit's many novels, Many Lives, and Red Bamboo are translated into English. In addition, there is a compilation of a few of Kukrit's English language writings and interviews, M. R. Kukrit Pramoj, His Wit and Wisdom, compiled by Vilas Manivat, and edited by Steve Van Beek. However, Kukrit's writings in the Thai language are voluminous, and include both fiction and non-fiction. Much of Kukrit's writing was first published as either columns or serials in the Siam Rat. A number of the books serialized and later turned into books including Four Reigns.  A wide range of subjects were addressed in these books, including contemporary politics, Kukrit's love of dogs, Thai history, Southeast Asian history, elephants, a history of the Jews, and many other subjects. A review of his book comparing feudalism in Thailand called sakdina and Britain was recently published in English. Kukrit's essay is called "Farang Sakdina." The article describes Kukrit's views about good governance, monarchy, and democracy in Thailand and Britain.

Novels
 Sam Kok Chabap Nai Thun (สามก๊กฉบับนายทุน; 1951) 
 Phai Daeng (ไผ่แดง; 1954) 
 Based on Giovanni Guareschi's 1950 novel The Little World of Don Camillo. Translated into English as Red Bamboo in 1961
 Su Si Thai Hao (ซูสีไทเฮา; 1957) 
 Jew (ยิว; 1967) 
 Four Reigns (สี่แผ่นดิน) 
 Translated into English as Four Reigns in 1981 by Tulachandra; 
 Kawao Thi Bang Phleng (กาเหว่าที่บางเพลง; 1989) 
 Based on John Wyndham's 1957 science fiction novel The Midwich Cuckoos. Adapted into a film of the same name in 1994.
 Lai Chiwit (หลายชีวิต) 
 Translated in English as Many Lives in 1996; 
 Khun Chang Khun Phaen (ขุนช้างขุนแผน; 1989)

Plays
 Rashomon (ราโชมอน) 
 Based on Akira Kurosawa's 1950 crime mystery film of the same name.

Collected short stories and essays
 Phuean Non (เพื่อนนอน; short stories, 1952) 
 "Mom" (มอม, published individually in 2011) 
 Sapphehera Khadi (สัพเพเหระคดี)

Non-fiction
 Phama Sia Mueang (พม่าเสียเมือง; 1967) , 
 Huang Mahannop (ห้วงมหรรณพ; 1959) 
 Chak Yipun (ฉากญี่ปุ่น; 1962) 
 Mueang Maya (เมืองมายา; 1965) 
 Khon Rak Ma (คนรักหมา; 1967) 
 Wai Run (วัยรุ่น; 1980) 
 Thammakhadi (ธรรมคดี; 1983) 
 Khrong Kraduk Nai Tu (โครงกระดูกในตู้) 
 Chao Lok (เจ้าโลก) 
 Kritsadaphinihan An Bot Bang Mi Dai (กฤษฎาภินิหารอันบดบังมิได้) , 
 Chang Nai Chiwit Khong Phom (ช้างในชีวิตของผม) 
 Phra Phutthasatsana Kap Khuekrit (พระพุทธศาสนากับคึกฤทธิ์) 
 Kho Khit Rueang Koet Kae Chep Tai (ข้อคิดเรื่อง เกิด แก่ เจ็บ ตาย) 
 Songkhram Phio (สงครามผิว) 
 Thok Khamen (ถกเขมร) 
 Banthoeng Roeng Rom (บันเทิงเริงรมย์) 
 Rueang Kham Khan (เรื่องขำขัน) 
 Kep Lek Phasom Noi (เก็บเล็กผสมน้อย) 
 Klai Rok (ไกลโรค) 
 Khon Khong Lok (คนของโลก) 
 Chom Suan (ชมสวน) 
 Talat Nat (ตลาดนัด) 
 Tham Haeng Ariya (ธรรมแห่งอริยะ) 
 Nam Phrik (น้ำพริก) 
 Beng Hek Phu Thuk Kluen Thang Pen (เบ้งเฮ็ก ผู้ถูกกลืนทั้งเป็น; 2001 [Revised]) 
 Arokhaya (อโรคยา) 
 Sappha Sat (สรรพสัตว์) 
 Khon Khong Lok (คนของโลก; 1967) 
 Farang Sakdina (1957-1958)
  M. R. Kukrit Pramoj, His Wit and Wisdom (Writings, Speeches, Interviews) 1983.  Compiled by Vilas Manivat, Edited by Steve Van Beek.  Editions Duang Kamol.  
 The King of Siam Speaks, by Seni Pramoj and Kukrit Pramoj 
Most Thai were shocked by the portrayal of their revered nineteenth-century king, Mongkut, in the musical The King and I. The stage and screen versions were based on Margaret Landon's 1944 book entitled Anna and the King of Siam. To correct the record, well-known Thai intellectuals Seni and Kukrit Pramoj wrote this account in 1948. The Pramoj brothers sent their manuscript to the American politician and diplomat Abbot Low Moffat (1901-1996), who drew on it for his biography entitled Mongkut the King of Siam (1961) . Moffat donated the Pramoj manuscript to the United States Library of Congress in 1961. (Southeast Asian Collection, Asian Division, Library of Congress)

Translations
 Jonathan Livingston Seagull by Richard Bach, translated as Jonathan Livingston Nang Nuan (จอนะธัน ลิวิงสตัน นางนวล; 1973)

Honours

National Honours
:
  Knight Grand Cross (First Class) of The Most Illustrious Order of Chula Chom Klao
  Knight Grand Cordon (Special Class) of The Most Exalted Order of the White Elephant
  Knight Grand Cordon (Special Class) of The Most Noble Order of the Crown of Thailand
  Knight Grand Commander (Second Class, Upper Grade) of The Most Illustrious Order of Chula Chom Klao
  King Rama IX Royal Cypher Medal, First Class
  Dushdi Mala Medal - Civilian

Foreign honours
:
 Honorary Grand Commander of the Order of the Defender of the Realm (1975)
:
 Grand Cross of the Order of the Aztec Eagle
:
 Grand Collar of the Order of Sikatuna
:
 Grand Cross of the Order of Prince Henry

 Grand Cross of the Order of Civil Merit

Academic rank
 Professor of Thammasat University

Other awards
 : Recipient of the Fukuoka Prize, 1990

See also
 Seni Pramoj
 Four Reigns

References

External links
 Chinese Ink In SE Asia, Interesting facts about Chinese in SEA
 The Home of M R Kukrit Pramoj - a legacy of Thailand's famous son
 Sights & Activities

Kukrit Pramoj
Kukrit Pramoj
Kukrit Pramoj
Kukrit Pramoj
Kukrit Pramoj
Kukrit Pramoj
Kukrit Pramoj
Kukrit Pramoj
Kukrit Pramoj
Kukrit Pramoj
Kukrit Pramoj
Kukrit Pramoj
Kukrit Pramoj
Kukrit Pramoj
Alumni of The Queen's College, Oxford
People educated at Trent College
Recipients of the Fukuoka Prize
Kukrit Pramoj
Grand Crosses 1st class of the Order of Merit of the Federal Republic of Germany
1911 births
1995 deaths
Kukrit Pramoj
Kukrit Pramoj
Kukrit Pramoj
Kukrit Pramoj
Kukrit Pramoj